The Church of St. Jovan Vladimir is a Serbian Orthodox Church located in Bar, Montenegro. It was built between 2006 and 2016.

References

External links
 Church website (Serbian)

Church buildings with domes
Serbian Orthodox church buildings in Montenegro